Karki is a village in Shahdol district in the state of Madhya Pradesh,  India.

References

Villages in Shahdol district